Brosh may refer to:

Places
Brosh, Israel
Brosh, Kardzhali Province, Bulgaria

People
Aline Brosh McKenna (born 1967), American screenwriter
Allie Brosh, cartoonist and blogger
Nili Brosh, Israeli guitarist
Nina Brosh (born 1975), Israeli model and actress
Ethan Brosh, American heavy metal guitarist